The Conley-Greene Rockshelter, also known as site 15EL4, is an archeological site in Elliott County, Kentucky.  It was listed on the National Register of Historic Places in 1986.

It appears to be a campsite of the late Early Woodland period.  The site has a thin midden and a 1991 study identified seven features including earthen ovens and basin-shaped pits.

References

Archaeological sites on the National Register of Historic Places in Kentucky
National Register of Historic Places in Elliott County, Kentucky
Early Woodland period
Rock shelters in the United States
Native American history of Kentucky